Jacques Malbrancq or Malbrancque, also known as Jacobus Malbrancq or Jacobi Malbrancq (born circa 1579 in Saint-Omer - died in 1653 in Tournai, in what is now Belgium), Father, Audomarensis, e Societate Jesu, was a Jesuit priest in the Southern Netherlands, professor and preacher at Saint-Omer Jesuit college. He is known for his extensive work on the Morini, a gallic tribe.

Works on the Morini 
His book, written in Latin, was published in Tournai, and contains three tomes.
  Doornik, 1639, Adrianus Quinque
  Doornik, 1647, Adrianus Quinque
  Doornik, 1654, Weduwe Adrianus Quinque

References

External links 
 Fonds Patrimonial de l’Institut catholique de Lille (French+Latin)

1579 births
1653 deaths
Jesuits of the Spanish Netherlands
Spanish Netherlands historians